Michalis Lountzis (alternate spelling: Michail) (born 4 August 1998) is a Greek professional basketball player for Olympiacos of the Greek Basket League and the EuroLeague. He is a 1.98 m (6'6") tall combo guard.

Early career
Lountzis started playing basketball in Zakynthos, where he is from. Lountzis was invited to the Next Generation Practices at the 2014 Adidas Eurocamp, in Treviso, Italy, and, earlier that year, to the Jordan Brand Classic International Tour.

Professional career
Lountzis played with Kronos Agiou Dimitriou in Greece's amateur level fourth division, in the 2013–14 season. On 23 June 2014, Lountzis signed a five-year deal with Panathinaikos of Greece's top-tier level Greek Basket League.  Lountzis made his professional debut at age 16, with Panathinaikos, on January 12, 2015, in a Greek Basket League victory over Panelefsiniakos.

He became the youngest player ever to play in the Greek Cup Final, when he played with Panathinaikos in their victory against Apollon Patras, in the 2015 Greek Cup Final, on April 5, 2015. He made his debut in the European-wide top-tier level EuroLeague, at the age of 16, on April 14, 2015, in a playoff game against CSKA Moscow.

On August 21, 2017, Lountzis was loaned to Trikala for the 2017–18 season. On July 27, 2018, Lountzis was loaned once more, this time to Lavrio for the 2018–19 season. On July 2, 2019, Lountzis was released from his contract with Panathinaikos after five years.

On August 5, 2019, Lountzis agreed to a new two-year (1+1) contract with Lavrio. He averaged 5.9 points, 2.6 rebounds and 1.25 assists per game. On July 24, 2020, Lountzis moved to Promitheas.

On July 6, 2021, he signed a three-year deal with Olympiacos.

National team career

Greek junior national team
Lountzis was the captain of the junior Greek Under-16 national team at the 2014 FIBA Europe Under-16 Championship. He also played with Greece's junior national teams at the 2015 FIBA Under-19 World Cup, the 2015 FIBA Europe Under-18 Championship, where he won a gold medal, and at the 2nd division 2016 FIBA Europe Under-20 Championship Division B, where he won a bronze medal. He also played at the 2017 FIBA Europe Under-20 Championship, where he won a gold medal.

Greek senior national team
Lountzis first became a member of the senior Greek national basketball team in 2018. He played at the 2019 FIBA World Cup qualification.

Awards and accomplishments

Club career
Greek League Champion: (2017, 2022)
5× Greek Cup Winner: (2015, 2016, 2017, 2022, 2023)
2× Greek Basketball Super Cup: (2020, 2022)

Greek junior national team
2015 FIBA Europe Under-18 Championship: 
2016 FIBA Europe Under-20 Championship Division B: 
2017 FIBA Europe Under-20 Championship:

See also 
 List of youngest EuroLeague players

References

External links
Euroleague.net Profile
FIBA Archive Profile
FIBA Europe Profile
Eurobasket.com Profile
Hellenic Federation Profile 
Greek Basket League Profile 
Greek Basket League Profile 
DraftExpress.com Profile
NBADraft.net Profile

1998 births
Living people
Aries Trikala B.C. players
Basketball players from Athens
Greek Basket League players
Greek men's basketball players
Lavrio B.C. players
Panathinaikos B.C. players
Promitheas Patras B.C. players
Point guards
Shooting guards